The Depósito del Automóvil (automobile depository) is a museum in the Old Havana section of Havana, Cuba. It consists of a small building made up of two large rooms. The cars are maintained to prevent damage but are not restored.

Address: Calle Oficios No. 12 y Callejón de Jústiz. La Habana Vieja. Ciudad de La Habana.

List of cars
 1926 Rolls-Royce Phantom I
 1953 MG TD
 1920s Fiat
 Alfa Romeo roadster
 1970s Daimler 
 1980s Chevy 
 replica of a 1957 Maserati used by Juan Manuel Fangio
 Cadillac V16 1930
 1959 Oldsmobile, owned by Commander Camilo Cienfuegos
 1918 Ford T 
 1930 Baby Lincoln
 1969 Citroën Méhari
 funeral carriage

List of Motor Bikes
 1977 Ducati 900SS owned by Fidel Castro

List of Trucks
 1915 Mack AC. Chain drive 3.5 ton, 4-cylinder, 4 gears

Other Exhibits
 3 fuel pumps
 a semaphore

External links
http://www.nytimes.com/2010/01/03/automobiles/03cuba.html
http://www.howstuffworks.com/1977-ducati-900ss.htm

Museums in Havana
Automotive museums